Backaryd is a locality situated in Ronneby Municipality, Blekinge County, Sweden with 365 inhabitants in 2010.

References 

Populated places in Ronneby Municipality